Edgar Francis Talman Sheldrake (18 January 1864 – 14 December 1950) was an English first-class cricketer. Sheldrake was a right-handed batsman and a fast bowler.

Edgar Sheldrake was born in Aldershot in Hampshire in 1864, the son of William Henry Sheldrake (1816–1885), a stationer and printer of Sheldrake's Aldershot Military Gazette, and Caroline Ann née Beadnell (1821–1885); he was baptised at St Michael's church in Aldershot in March 1864. As a young man he joined his father's publishing and printing business in Aldershot.

Sheldrake represented Hampshire in three first-class matches. The first came in 1884 against Sussex. His final first-class match came against Surrey in the 1885 season, which was to be Hampshire's final season as a first-class county until the 1895 County Championship.

On 3 February 1900 he married Lucy Maunde (1862–1935) at St Bartholomew's church in Haslemere in Surrey. There were no children from the marriage. After his cricketing career he continued to work for the family newsagent and stationers business.

Sheldrake died in Surbiton, Surrey on 14 December 1950.

References

External links
Edgar Sheldrake at Cricinfo
Edgar Sheldrake at CricketArchive

1864 births
1950 deaths
Cricketers from Aldershot
English cricketers
Hampshire cricketers